Kopelman is a surname. Notable people with the surname include:

 Josh Kopelman (born 1972), American entrepreneur, venture capitalist, and philanthropist
 Mikhail Kopelman (born 1947), Russian-American violinist
 Kopelman Quartet, American string quartet

See also
 Koppelman

Jewish surnames